A Smile is the first album by Dappled Cities Fly, released in 2004.

Track listing
 "Peach" – 3:34
 "Blame It on the Boys" – 3:12
 "League of German Girls" – 3:13
 "Corpus Kinaethesia" – 2:36
 "Make You Happy" – 2:15
 "As I Lay Dying" – 4:48
 "My Head's Queen Ant" – 3:39
 "Cream" – 2:56
 "Die in Your Eyes" – 3:57
 "Faces" – 3:13
 "States" – 3:41

Dappled Cities Fly albums
2004 debut albums